On 18 April 2022 16:45 Central Indonesian Time, a three-storey building which included an Alfamart convenience store collapsed in Gambut district, Banjar Regency, South Kalimantan.  As of 21 April 2022, the collapse resulted in 14 casualties including five deaths and search was still conducted by police and rescuers.

Reaction 
BPJS Ketenagakerjaan, mandatory insurance for workers in Indonesia awarded compensations to all the victims in the collapse which includes 48 times the amount of monthly salary for fatal casualties to the victim's families. Alfamart's Banjarmasin branch which managed stores across South Kalimantan said that they will pay all the medical expense in addition of compensations to all victims of the collapse as well. Experts from police, Ministry of Public Works and Housing, and Lambung Mangkurat University have started an investigation regarding the cause of the collapse.

References 

Building collapses in Asia
Building collapses in 2022
2022 in Indonesia
April 2022 events in Indonesia
2022 disasters in Indonesia